The 1888 Cork Senior Hurling Championship was the second staging of the Cork Senior Hurling Championship since its establishment by the Cork County Board in 1887. The draw for the opening round fixtures took place on 21 February 1888. The championship began on 3 March 1888 and ended on 29 April 1888. Due to the increased number of teams taking part, a divisional system was used.

Cork Nationals were the defending champions, however, they were beaten by St. Finbarr's 2nd 21.

On 29 April 1888, Tower St. won the championship following a 4-1 to 0-1 defeat of Ballygarvan in the final. This remains the club's only championship title.

Participating teams

Results

Cork city

East Cork

North-East Cork

North Cork

South Cork

Mid-Cork

Knockout stage

First round

Semi-finals

Final

Championship statistics

Miscellaneous

 In the first round of the Cork city division, Cork Nationals received a walkover from St Mary's after the latter were only able to field 14 players.
 The Aghabullogue-Blarney tie in the Mid-Cork division ended in a scoreless draw, however, Aghabullogue were declared the winners after being adjudged to haven been the better team.

References

Cork Senior Hurling Championship
Cork Senior Hurling Championship